Scobell is a surname. Notable people with the surname include:

 Edward Scobell (naval officer) (1784–1825)
 Edward Scobell (priest) (1850–1917)
 George Treweeke Scobell (1785–1869), politician
 Henry Jenner Scobell (1859–1912), military officer
 Henry Scobell (c. 1610–1660), official
 John Scobell (1879–1955), army officer
 Walker Scobell (born 2009), actor

See also
 Scobell House, residential hall at Carnegie Mellon University